The radian per second (symbol: rad⋅s−1 or rad/s) is the unit of angular velocity in the International System of Units (SI). The radian per second is also the SI unit of angular frequency, commonly denoted by the Greek letter ω (omega). The radian per second is defined as the angular frequency that results in the angular displacement increasing by one radian every second.

The angular frequency of one radian per second corresponds to a frequency of 1/(2) hertz (Hz), or cycles per second. This is because one cycle of rotation corresponds to an angular rotation of one turn (360 degrees), which equals 2 radians. Since the radian is a dimensionless unit in the SI, the radian per second is dimensionally equivalent to the hertz—both are defined as s−1.  One radian per second also corresponds to about 9.55 revolutions per minute.

{| class="wikitable"
|+ Quantity correspondence
|-
! Angular frequency  !! Frequency 
|-
|| 2π rad/s ||1 Hz
|-
|| 1 rad/s || ≈ 0.159155 Hz
|-
|| 1 rad/s || ≈ 9.5493 rpm
|-
|| 0.1047 rad/s || ≈ 1 rpm
|-
|}

Coherent units 
A use of the unit radian per second is in calculation of the power transmitted by a shaft. In the International System of Quantities (SI) and the International System of Units, widely used in physics and engineering, the power p is equal to the rotational speed ω multiplied by the torque τ applied to the shaft: .  When coherent units are used for these quantities, which are respectively the watt, the radian per second, and the newton-metre, and thus , no numerical factor needed when performing the numerical calculation. When the units are not coherent (e.g. horsepower, turn/min, and pound-foot), an additional factor will generally be necessary.

See also 
 Cycle per second
 Normalized frequency (digital signal processing)
 Order of magnitude (angular velocity)

References 

SI derived units
Units of angular velocity